Carl Weber may refer to:

 Carl Weber (theatre director) (1925–2016), theatre director and professor of drama
 Carl Maria von Weber (1786–1826), German composer
 Carl Albert Weber (1856–1931), German botanist
 Karl Ivanovich Weber (1841–1910), diplomat of the Russian Empire
 Karl Otto Weber (1827–1867), German surgeon and pathologist
 Max Carl Wilhelm Weber (1852–1937), German zoologist and biogeographer
 Carl Weber (artist) (1851–1921), German-American artist, son of Paul Weber
Carl Weber (American author) (born 1964), American author and publisher
 Carl Weber (architect), 19th-century German architect who designed many churches in the Netherlands; see Carl Weber (in Dutch)

See also
Karl Weber (disambiguation)